Smoky Valley Roller Mills, now known as the Lindsborg Old Mill & Swedish Heritage Museum, is an historic mill and museum on Mill Street in Lindsborg, Kansas.

History
Smoky Valley Roller Mills was built in 1898 to make flour from wheat. The roller mill was operated by several different owners. It was closed temporarily 1927-1934, until closing for the last time as an active business in 1955. It was originally water powered, but converted to electricity in the 1930s. The building was given to McPherson County in 1962. Malcolm Esping of Lindsborg and George Tesarek, a retired Quaker Oats miller from St. Joseph, Mo. led the restoration of the building from 1974 to 1981.

The building is now part of a museum owned by a nonprofit organization formed in 2021. The museum grounds also include the 1904 World's Fair Swedish Pavilion and other buildings with local history exhibits, especially pertaining to Swedish-American history. The museum is open Monday-Saturday, year round, except for specific holidays. The mill building was added to the National Register of Historic Places in 1972.

Gallery

References

Related reading
 Saul, Norman E. ( 2000) Mill Town Kansas in the Age of Turkey Red (Kansas Historical Society)

External links
 Old Mill Museum

Industrial buildings completed in 1898
Industrial buildings and structures on the National Register of Historic Places in Kansas
Museums in McPherson County, Kansas
Mill museums in the United States
Open-air museums in Kansas
Swedish-American culture in Kansas
Lindsborg, Kansas
National Register of Historic Places in McPherson County, Kansas